Steven Ryde (born 8 December 1971) is an English actor, voice-over artist and producer, best known for his role as Tatty Bogle from 1994 to 1998 in the children's TV series Wizadora. He has worked mainly in children's television for over 30 years.

He has appeared in various television programmes, including Your Mother Wouldn't Like It, Palace Hill, a spin-off from YMWLI, playing Jimmy the Time Warp Kid and Wizadora, in which he played the scarecrow Tatty Bogle from 1994 to 1998.

In 1993, Ryde was selected to provide the voice-over links between programmes for a partially revamped Children's ITV, essentially as an off-screen presenter. In 1998, Ryde was offered the producer's role for the children's programming strand, and was charged with another relaunch of CiTV as it returned to in-vision presenters.

In 1997, he co-wrote and appeared in the short film Suckers. Between 2002 and 2006 he produced the CBBC programme Dick and Dom in Da Bungalow in which he was also the commentator for the game Bogies. The programme won BAFTA awards for Best Entertainment Show and Best Presenters. The Slammer (2006/2007) won a Children's BAFTA for Best Entertainment Programme in 2007. and Sam and Mark's Big Friday Wind Up (2016/2017) later won the same award, whilst Diddy Movies (2013/14) won a BAFTA award for Children's Comedy.

Ryde is also known for producing CBBC children's shows The Slammer (2006), Harry Batt (2007), Chute! (2007),The Legend of Dick & Dom (2009), ' (2011), Dick and Dom's Hoopla (2012),  The Slammer Returns (2013) Diddy TV (2016) and Crackerjack (2020).

References

External links
 

1971 births
Living people
English male television actors
English male voice actors
Male actors from Yorkshire
People from North Yorkshire